Ewartiothamnus is a genus of flowering plants in the family Asteraceae native to New Zealand. It contains a single species, Ewartiothamnus sinclairii.

Gnaphalieae
Monotypic Asteraceae genera